And Never Said a Word is a novel by German author Heinrich Böll, published in 1953. The novel deals with the thoughts and actions of Fred and Käte Bogner, a married couple. Fred, feeling sick of the poverty of their house, has left her with their three children. They continue to meet on a casual basis every time Fred can find money enough to book a hotel room. As in numerous works from the German writer, the main theme is the situation in Germany after World War II.

The title stems from a song listened to by Käte in the fourth chapter, creating a parallel between her and Jesus; like Christ, she is shown bearing all humiliations without rebelling.

See also
 1953 in literature
 German literature

References

1953 German novels
Novels by Heinrich Böll
Novels set in Germany
Kiepenheuer & Witsch books